Rowan Anthony Williams (born 18 March 1968 in Birmingham) is a retired English boxer who competed in the flyweight division (– 48 kg). He represented Great Britain at the 1992 Summer Olympics in Barcelona, Spain. There he was defeated in the quarterfinals by Roel Velasco of the Philippines.

Personal life 	
Rowan has two sons; Akeem-Chavez Anthony, aged 30 and Kareem-Shakur, aged 26.

References

External links
 

1968 births
Boxers at the 1992 Summer Olympics
English male boxers
Flyweight boxers
Living people
Olympic boxers of Great Britain
Boxers from Birmingham, West Midlands